The Arboretum du Petit-Bois (0.5 hectares) is an arboretum located in Montfaucon d'Argonne, Meuse, Lorraine, France. It began in 1996, contains about 50 types of trees, and is open daily without charge.

See also 
 List of botanical gardens in France

References 

 L'Echo des Chênaies entry (French)

Petit-Bois, Arboretum du
Petit-Bois, Arboretum du